Deerfield High School is a public high school located in Deerfield, Wisconsin. The school mascot is the Demon. It is located on 300 Simonson Blvd. The current principal is Brad Johnsrud. Deerfield High School is part of the Trailways conference for athletics and academic competitions. For cross country and soccer, Deerfield High School joins with Cambridge in a co-op for these two athletic activities.

References

External links
Deerfield High School website

Schools in Dane County, Wisconsin
Educational institutions in the United States with year of establishment missing
Public high schools in Wisconsin